Strikeforce: Diaz vs. Daley was a mixed martial arts event held by Strikeforce, the event took place on April 9, 2011, at the Valley View Casino Center in San Diego, California, United States.

Background
This was the first non-Challengers event that Strikeforce held under the management of their new owners Zuffa, who bought the promotion the previous month.

This event was originally expected to feature Alistair Overeem vs. Fabrício Werdum and Josh Barnett vs. Brett Rogers, the two remaining quarter-final fights in the Heavyweight Grand Prix tournament.  Both the event and the fights were listed on Strikeforce's official site.  However, on March 2, 2011, Scott Coker confirmed the bouts were being moved to the Strikeforce: Overeem vs. Werdum event to be held in Dallas, Texas, on June 18 with Overeem & Barnett winning the rescheduled bouts.

K. J. Noons was expected to make his return to lightweight on this card,  but a bout did not materialize.

Mike Kyle was scheduled to face Gegard Mousasi, but withdrew from the bout on March 31, 2011, due to a broken hand. Keith Jardine agreed to step in on one week's notice to fight Mousasi. The Mousasi/Kyle bout finally took place at Strikeforce: Marquardt vs. Saffiedine in January 2013, where Mousasi submitted Kyle with a rear naked choke in the first round.

This is the last non-Challengers Strikeforce event to feature men's bouts in weight classes below lightweight.

The event drew an estimated average of 528,000 viewers, however peaked at 806,000 viewers.

Results

Payroll
Nick Diaz: $175,000 (no win bonus)
def. Paul Daley: $65,000

Gilbert Melendez: $150,000 (no win bonus)
def. Tatsuya Kawajiri: $97,612.50

Gegard Mousasi: $150,000
drew Keith Jardine: $25,000

Shinya Aoki: $73,637.50 (no win bonus)
def. Lyle Beerbohm: $10,000

Robert Peralta: $4,000 (includes $2,000 win bonus)
def. Hiroyuki Takaya: $2,740

Virgil Zwicker: $3,000 ($1,000 win bonus)
def. Brett Albee: $1,000

Joe Duarte: $2,000 ($1,000 win bonus)
def. Saad Awad: $1,500

Herman Terrado: $1,500 ($500 win bonus)
def. A.J. Matthews: $1,000

Rolando Perez: $3,000 ($1,000 win bonus)
def. Tom Peterson: $1,000

Casey Ryan: $2,000 ($1,000 win bonus)
def. Paul Song: $750

References

Diaz vs. Daley
2011 in mixed martial arts
Mixed martial arts in San Diego
2011 in sports in California
Events in San Diego